Léon Aimé (9 February 1924 – 31 August 2021) was a French politician.

Aimé was born in Longeville-sur-Mer, and became a farmer in Moutiers-les-Mauxfaits. In 1965, he was elected to the municipal council, then became deputy mayor in 1971. Aimé won the mayoralty in 1975, and remained in office until 1995. Several terms in other political offices overlapped with Aimé's tenure as mayor. He was selected to replace , who had died in office, on the General Council of Vendée, in 1981. Aimé stepped down from the general council in 2001. From 1993 to 1997, Aimé was a member of the National Assembly, replacing Philippe Mestre, who had been appointed Minister of Veterans Affairs.

Aimé was awarded officer of the Order of Agricultural Merit, officier Ordre des Palmes académiques, and knight of the Legion of Honour. Aimé died, aged 97, on 31 August 2021. At the time of Léon Aimé's death, his son, Christian Aimé, was serving a second term as mayor of Moutiers-les-Mauxfaits.

References

1924 births
2021 deaths
French general councillors
Deputies of the 10th National Assembly of the French Fifth Republic
Mayors of places in Pays de la Loire
Union for French Democracy politicians
People from Vendée
Officers of the Order of Agricultural Merit
Officiers of the Ordre des Palmes Académiques
Chevaliers of the Légion d'honneur
French farmers
20th-century farmers
21st-century farmers